() is a social class that emerged in mid-18th-century Germany, as the educated social stratum of the bourgeoisie, men and women who had received an education based upon the metaphysical values of Idealism and Classical studies of the Graeco–Roman culture of Antiquity.

Term 

In the German compound word , the word  denotes "culture" and "education" as defined in the Age of Enlightenment.  also corresponds to the educational ideal presented in the works of Wilhelm von Humboldt, thus  connotes that education is a life-long process, and not merely the acquisition of knowledge and training.

Formation 

The  social class emerged in the society of Germany in the middle of the 18th century. As a social class of rich people, the  first emerged in the societies of the free imperial cities, where they gained material wealth, achieved a social status, and had access to education, which was based on Alexander von Humboldt's educational ideal; that  (culture and education) aimed towards human perfectibility, that a person's potential could be realized through a Classical education. 

In late-stage absolute monarchy, the management of state required many educated officials to realise orders and reforms. To avert a French-style violent revolution in Germany, the government created a national status class of men and women to receive a classical education that would prepare them to discharge the duties and responsibilities of political administration; thus the  social class was defined culturally, not socio-economically. The German universities established to educate the administrative social class, e.g. Humboldt University, became the institutional model for modern universities elsewhere in Europe. 

At its origin, nationalism was a liberal ideal, and in German nationalism, the  usually were members of the politically liberal factions of German society. Therefore, the cultured bourgeoisie usually were at the fore of the politics for establishing a sovereign nation state for the Germans; yet, by the 1870s, most of the  had become politically conservative and reactionary, having lost their progressive liberalism to the reductive ideology of nationalism.

 possessing an academic education
 in-group behaviour, self-isolation from other social classes; neo-aristocratic thinking concerning social stature and pedigree
 high self-recruitment
 social prestige at being perceived as a more-important person of great wealth
 predominantly Protestant
 considered the "cultural élite"
 dominated certain professions

In Germany the Bildungsbürgertum exercised first influence before the bourgeoisie as the commercial class gained more influence during industrialization from 1850 onwards. In France and Britain, it developed mainly as a commercial class and could, by virtue of its economic strength, claim political power. In Germany the formation of the bourgeoisie occurred only in the first half of the 1800s, to be politically active. It played a crucial role in the revolution of 1848, which nevertheless failed.

A well-known example for an individual associated with the term  is the 20th-century writer Thomas Mann.

According to sociologist Liah Greenfeld, the rise of the Bildungsbürger facilitated the creation of a German national identity.

See also 
 Cultural capital
 Grand Burgher (German )
 Habitus (sociology)
 Hanseaten (class)
 High culture
 Intelligentsia
 Mentifact
 Patrician (post-Roman Europe)
 Scholar official (The first meritocratic class of history)
 Social environment
 Social status
 Symbolic capital
 Upper middle class

References

Literature 
 Werner Conze, Jürgen Kocka (red.): Bildungsbürgertum im 19. Jahrhundert. Klett-Cotta, Stuttgart 1985 ff.
1. Bildungssystem und Professionalisierung in internationalen Vergleichen. 1985, .
3. Lebensführung und ständische Vergesellschaftung. 1992, .
 Lothar Gall: Bürgertum, liberale Bewegung und Nation. Ausgewählte Aufsätze. Orbis-Verlag, München 2000, .
 Michael Hartmann: Der Mythos von den Leistungseliten. Spitzenkarrieren und soziale Herkunft in Wirtschaft, Politik, Justiz und Wissenschaft. Campus Verlag, Frankfurt/M. 2002, .
 Malte Herwig: Eliten in einer egalitären Welt. wjs-Verlag, Berlin 2005, . (Website zum Buch)
 Oskar Köhler: Bürger, Bürgertum. I: Staatslexikon. Herder, Freiburg/B.
1. 1985,   Sp. 1040 ff. (mit weiterführender Literatur)
 Mario R. Lepsius (red.): Das Bildungsbürgertum als ständische Vergesellschaftung. In: Derselbe: Lebensführung und ständische Vergesellschaftung. Klett-Cotta, Stuttgart 1992, .
 Pia Schmid: Deutsches Bildungsbürgertum. Bürgerliche Bildung zwischen 1750 und 1830. Dissertation, Universität Frankfurt/M. 1984.
 Klaus Vondung (red.): Das wilhelminische Bildungsbürgertum. Zur Sozialgeschichte seiner Ideen. Vandenhoeck & Ruprecht, Göttingen 1976, .

Social classes
Social class in Germany
Social history
Sociology of education
Upper middle class
History of Europe
Bourgeoisie